The 1959 Detroit Titans football team represented the University of Detroit as an independent during the 1959 NCAA University Division football season. In their first year under head coach Jim Miller, the Titans compiled a 6–4 record and were outscored by a combined total of 199 to 139.

Seven players from the 1959 Detroit team went on to play in the National Football League (NFL): Grady Alderman, Bruce Maher, Ernie Fritsch, Larry Vargo, Jim Shorter, Steve Stonebreaker, and Frank Jackunas. The team's statistical leaders included Tony Hanley with 544 passing yards, Bruce Maher with 595 rushing yards and 66 points scored, and Tom Chapman with 270 receiving yards.

Schedule

References

External links
 1959 University of Detroit football programs

Detroit
Detroit Titans football seasons
Detroit Titans football
Detroit Titans football